"Undiscovered" is a song written by British singer James Morrison, Martin Brammer, Steve Robson and performed by Morrison. The song appears on Morrison's debut album Undiscovered and was released as his fourth single on 12 March 2007. "Undiscovered" was featured in the soundtrack for She's Out of My League.

Track listing
iTunes UK Download
 "Undiscovered" (Live In Tokyo)

Charts

References

2007 singles
James Morrison (singer) songs
Songs written by James Morrison (singer)
Songs written by Steve Robson
Songs written by Martin Brammer
Rock ballads
Song recordings produced by Steve Robson
2006 songs
Polydor Records singles